Hellbound is the second studio album by German heavy Metal band Warlock, released in 1985.

Track listing

Personnel

Warlock
Doro Pesch – vocals
Rudy Graf – guitar
Peter Szigeti – guitar
Frank Rittel – bass guitar
Michael Eurich – drums

Production
Henry Staroste – producer, arrangements, mixing
Rainer Assmann – producer, engineer, mixing
Harry Thumann – Fairlight programming
Peter Zimmermann – management

References

1985 albums
Warlock (band) albums
Vertigo Records albums
Mercury Records albums